This is a list of international presidential trips made by Recep Tayyip Erdoğan, the 12th and current President of Turkey, since he assumed the presidency on August 28, 2014.

The number of visits per country where he travelled are:
 1 visit to Afghanistan, Angola, Argentina, Bahrain, Belarus, Bulgaria, Chad, Chile, Colombia, Côte d'Ivoire, Croatia, Cuba, Democratic Republic of the Congo, Djibouti, Ecuador, Equatorial Guinea, Estonia, Ethiopia, Gambia, Ghana, Greece, Guinea, India, Indonesia, Jordan, Kenya, Kyrgyzstan, Latvia, Madagascar, Malaysia, Mali, Mauritania, Mexico, Moldova, Montenegro, Mozambique, Paraguay, Peru, Romania, Slovakia, Slovenia, South Africa, South Korea, Spain, Sudan, Switzerland, Tajikistan, Tanzania, Togo, Uganda, United Arab Emirates, Vatican City, Venezuela, Zambia
 2 visits to Albania, Hungary, Italy, Japan, Kazakhstan, Nigeria, Poland, Serbia, Somalia, Tunisia
 3 visits to Algeria, Iran, Turkmenistan, United Kingdom, Uzbekistan
 4 visits to Bosnia and Herzegovina, China, France, Germany, Kuwait, Pakistan, Senegal, Ukraine
 5 visits to Northern Cyprus
 6 visits to Saudi Arabia
 7 visits to Belgium, Qatar
 10 visits to United States
 12 visits to Azerbaijan
 13 visits to Russia

Summary

2014

2015

2016

2017

2018

2019

2020

2021

2022

Multilateral meetings 
Multilateral meetings of the following intergovernmental organizations are scheduled to take place during Erdogan's term in office as president.

See also
List of international prime ministerial trips made by Recep Tayyip Erdoğan
List of international presidential trips made by Abdullah Gül
Foreign relations of Turkey

References

Recep Tayyip Erdoğan
State visits by Turkish presidents
Lists of 21st-century trips
21st century in international relations
State visits by Turkish leaders
Trips
Diplomatic visits by heads of state